Doaa al-Karwan (Arabic: دعاء الكروان)(The Call of the Curlew) is a novel by Taha Hussein, an Egyptian writer, published in 1934. Taha Hussein dedicated it to the writer Abbas Al-Akkad. The Lebanese poet Khalil Mutran was inspired to write a poem by the atmosphere of the novel. It was notable for containing the first use of flashback narrative in an Arabic-language novel.

The novel was translated into French in 1949. The novel was made into a movie titled The Nightingale's Prayer in 1959, directed by Henri Barakat, with Taha Hussein participating in his own voice at the end of the film. The novel was translated into English in 1980.

Theme
This novel describes the life experiences of Amna, a girl who witnessed the murder of her sister by her uncle for preserving the 'honor' of family. After finding out the real culprit of the murder -an engineer-, Amna tries to take revenge on him. She works in his home as a maid anonymously and tries to kill him multiple times but fails miserably. Later on she fell in love with the engineer. When her uncle found out that she is in a relationship with the engineer, he comes to kill her for the same reason. However, the engineer saves her life by killing her uncles.

Review
Peter Bradshaw commented on the movie based on this novel: "This is an extravagant revenge melodrama, or Beauty-and-the-Beast fable, from the Egyptian film-maker Henry Barakat, based on a novel by Taha Hussein".

References 

1934 books
Egyptian novels